Catan, previously known as The Settlers of Catan or simply Settlers, is a multiplayer board game designed by Klaus Teuber. It was first published in 1995 in Germany by Franckh-Kosmos Verlag (Kosmos) as Die Siedler von Catan. Players take on the roles of settlers, each attempting to build and develop holdings while trading and acquiring resources. Players gain victory points as their settlements grow; the first to reach a set number of victory points, typically 10, wins. The game and its many expansions are also published by Catan Studio, Filosofia, GP, Inc., 999 Games, Κάισσα (Káissa), and Devir. Upon its release, The Settlers of Catan became one of the first Eurogames to achieve popularity outside Europe. , more than 32 million copies in 40 languages had been sold.

Gameplay

The players in the game represent settlers establishing settlements on the fictional island of Catan. Players build settlements, cities, and roads to connect them as they settle the island. The game board, which represents the island, is composed of hexagonal tiles (hexes) of different land types, which are laid out randomly at the beginning of each game. Newer editions of the game began to depict a fixed layout in their manual, which has been proved by computer simulations to be fairly even-handed, and recommend this to be used by beginners. In 2016, editions of the game were released with a conventional fixed layout board in this configuration, the hexes of which cannot be rearranged.

Players build by spending resources (wool, grain, lumber, brick, and ore) that are depicted by these resource cards; each land type, with the exception of the unproductive desert, produces a specific resource: hills produce brick, forests produce lumber, mountains produce ore, fields produce grain, and pastures produce wool. On each player's turn, two six-sided dice are rolled to determine which hexes produce resources. Players with a settlement adjacent to a hex containing the number just rolled receive one card of the corresponding resource; cities produce two cards of the corresponding resource. For example, if a player has one city and two settlements adjacent to a grain hex, that player would take four grain resource cards if the corresponding number was rolled.

There is also a robber token, initially placed on the desert; if a player rolls 7, the robber must be moved to another hex, which will no longer produce resources until the robber is moved again. That player may also steal a resource card from another player with a settlement or city adjacent to the robber's new placement. In addition, when a 7 is rolled, all players with 8 or more resource cards must discard their choice of half of their cards, rounded down. For example, If a player has 9 resource cards, and a 7 is rolled, the player must get rid of 4 cards.

On the player's turn, the player may spend resource cards to build roads or settlements, upgrade settlements to cities (which replace existing settlements), or buy development cards. Players can trade resource cards with each other; players may also trade off-island (in effect, with the non-player bank) at a ratio of four-to-one resources for one of any other. By building settlements adjacent to ports, players may trade with the bank at three-to-one (three of any single resource type) or two-to-one (two of a specific resource) ratios, depending on the port's location.

The goal of the game is to reach ten victory points. Players score one point for each settlement they own and two for each city. Various other achievements, such as establishing the longest road and the largest army (by playing the most knight cards), grant a player additional victory points.

Resource cards can also be spent to buy a development card. There are three different types of development cards, including cards worth one victory point; knight cards, which allow the player to move the robber as if they had rolled a 7 (but without the remove-half rule); and the third set of cards which allow the player one of three abilities when played.

Teuber's original design was for a large game of exploration and development in a new land. Between 1993 and 1995 Teuber and Kosmos refined and simplified the game into its current form. Unused mechanics from that design went on to be used in Teuber's following games, Entdecker and Löwenherz. The game's first expansion, Catan: Seafarers, adds the concept of exploration, and the combined game (sometimes known as "New Shores") is probably the closest game to Teuber's original intentions.

Extensions, expansions, and updates

The base game of the Catan series, Catan, is designed for 3–4 players. In 1996, an extension to allow up to six players was released for the base game. As well as extra components to accommodate more players, the expansion adds an extra building phase to the turn, so that players can participate in the game during each other's turns. Players may not trade with other players during this phase nor may they trade in with the bank (maritime trade) from their own hand.

After releasing the 5- to 6-player extension, Teuber began to publish expansions for the base game. The first, Seafarers of Catan, was released in 1997; it was later retitled Catan: Seafarers. Seafarers adds ships that allow players to cross sea hexes, and includes scenarios in which players explore an archipelago of islands. It also adds gold-producing hexes that allow players to take the resource of their choice.

The second major expansion to the game, Cities and Knights of Catan (later Catan: Cities and Knights), was released in 1998. It adds concepts from the card game and its first expansion to Catan, including Knights who must be used to defend Catan from invading barbarians, and improvements that can be bought for cities that give benefits to players. Three commodities (paper, coin, and cloth) can be produced, in addition to the original resources. A 5- to 6-player extension for Cities & Knights was released at the same time. In 2000, a book of variations for Settlers was released.

The third large expansion, Catan: Traders & Barbarians, was released in 2008. Traders & Barbarians collects a number of smaller scenarios, some of which have previously been published elsewhere. The set includes an official two-player variant.

A special edition of the game was released in 2005: a 10th-anniversary collector's edition of the base game and Cities & Knights, with hand-painted 3D tiles and playing pieces.

Mayfair Games released a fourth edition of The Settlers of Catan in 2007, with new artwork, a locking frame, a deeper box, and an insert tray; there was also a minor rule change. Soon after its release, two changes were made to the fourth edition. The robber playing piece was changed from a black to a grey color and the soldier development card was renamed a knight. Fourth-edition versions of Cities & Knights, Seafarers, and the 5- to 6-player extensions were also released.

Catan: Explorers & Pirates, the fourth large expansion, was released in 2013. which introduces new elements for the game including moving ships, new resources, and pirates.

The Catan line was rebranded in 2015 for the 20th anniversary of the series, with the original Settlers game renamed simply Catan.

There are variations of the visual style of the game with subsequent releases. A list of version comparisons can be found here:

Variants and scenarios

In 1998, the first Historical Scenario pack was released, which allows players to re-enact the building of the pyramids of Egypt or the expansion of Alexander the Great's empire using Catan game mechanics. A second scenario pack for Settlers concerning the building of the Great Wall of China and the Trojan war was released in 2001.

 was published in 2000. It contained the rules and pieces for 15 new scenarios and many variants.

Atlantis: Scenarios and Variants was published in 2005. Atlantis was a boxed set which collected a number of scenarios and variants published in gaming magazines and at conventions, such as The Volcano and The Great River. The set also included a deck of event cards which replaced the dice in the main game, giving it a less random spread of resource production. The event cards, which were also available as a standalone item, have since been re-released in a modified form in the Traders and Barbarians expansion.

Kosmos, Mayfair, and 999 Games released the first stand-alone "Catan Geographies" title, Catan Germany, in 2008.

In 2009,  ('Treasures, Dragons & Adventurers') was published. This was a scenario pack for fans that included six new scenarios and the pieces needed to play them. It was re-released in 2017 with artwork updated to match the 2015 fourth edition of Settlers of Catan. Treasures, Dragons & Adventurers will be available in English as of July 16, 2021.

Catan: Oil Springs is an expansion by Erik Assadourian and Ty Hansen introduced in 2011 designed to draw attention to environmental issues. It is offered as a free download or for purchase from the Mayfair Games website. The scenario adds oil fields that can be used to make other resources and develop metropolises, but disasters can strike if too much oil is used. Oil can also be taken out of the game, for victory points and to prevent disasters.

The scenario Catan: Frenemies was released in 2012. In Frenemies, players are rewarded with redeemable "favor tokens" for "helping" their opponents by moving the robber harmlessly, giving away resources, and connecting their roads to their opponents' road networks. Depending on the circumstances, these favors might not be helpful.

Helpers of Catan is an expansion released in 2013. The computer opponent characters from the PC/Mac game Catan – Cities & Knights return in this scenario as "helper cards", which can be used during gameplay; for example, the helper card for Candamir allows the player who uses it to substitute any one resource when buying a development card.

Spinoffs and other related products

The popularity of The Settlers of Catan led to the creation of spinoff games and products, starting in 1996 with The Settlers of Catan card game (later renamed to Catan Card Game), and the 2003 novel, Die Siedler von Catan, by German historical fiction author Rebecca Gablé, which tells the story of a group of Norse seafarers who set out in search of the mythical island of Catan.

In 2002 a travel edition of Catan was published, featuring playing pieces which slot into a fixed-layout board.

In 1999, Starfarers of Catan was released. It was loosely based upon the original Catan, including similar dice mechanisms for resource production as well as trading and building. However, the spin-off also introduces spaceports, spaceships, and the flight mechanism.

The "Catan Histories" subseries includes Settlers of the Stone Age, a re-release of Struggle for Rome, Settlers of America, and Rise of the Inkas.

The Catan Dice Game was released in 2007. The game is played with six dice, the faces of which depict one of six resources (brick, lumber, wool, grain, ore, or gold). The dice are rolled up to three times, and the score of each roll is recorded by "building" roads, settlements, cities, and knights on a score sheet that shows a miniature version of the island of Catan. In the base game, one to four players try to get the highest score. There is also a "plus" version of the game, which, like the original Catan board game, is a race to be the first player to score 10 victory points.

In addition to the Catan Card Game above, two additional card game spinoffs have been published. Rivals for Catan, published in 2010, is a two-player strategy game for expert players that plays like a board game, and The Struggle for Catan, published in 2011, is a two- to four-player game that plays more like a card game and is suitable for Catan novices.

Catan Junior is a 2012 spinoff for families with children. The game is based on the original Settlers of Catan with a "pirate" theme and simpler rules. Players build "pirates' lairs" in the islands and build ships to reach new building sites. Resource and development cards are replaced with tiles, trading and building are simpler, and the "Ghost Captain" does not steal resources as the robber in the base game does.

Star Trek Catan is a spin-off of the original series released in 2012 by Mayfair Games. The game uses the same basic components with new names, new graphics, and some minor rules additions. The building costs and resources match the original game. It incorporates the "Helpers of Catan" expansion, with the cards renamed as Star Trek characters.

A Game of Thrones Catan: Brotherhood of the Watch is a spin-off based on George R. R. Martin's A Song of Ice and Fire series. As Brothers of the Night Watch, players harvest resources from the Gift to build settlements and keeps, while contributing to the defense of the Wall. The game was released in 2017 in English, German, Spanish, Italian, Polish, Russian, Czech/Slovak, Japanese, Brazilian Portuguese, Hebrew and French.

Catan: Dawn of Humankind is a spin-off featuring the first humans published by Catan Studios in 2022. Players move their tribe to explore new continents and establish camps.

Catanimals
Mayfair released a series of mini-stuffed animals based on the different resources presented in the game. An updated set of Catanimal Sprite plushes was introduced in early 2021 and are based on new illustrated characters by artist Kay O'Neill.

Reception
Richard Dansky comments that "for all of its elemental simplicity, The Settlers of Catan has breathtaking depth and breadth of experience. It's a resource-management game, defined by position and strategizing. It's a social game, defined by horsetrading of resource cards and 'Siccing the Fritz' (as my friends call the robber) with bloodthirsty bonhomie. It's a game of chance, ruled by dice rolls and card draws. It's a hardcore game and a light social pastime and everything in between, a laboratory where I can test a hundred different play styles and a genuine reason to invite friends over."

It is popular in the United States where it has been called "the board game of our time" by The Washington Post. A 2012 American documentary film titled Going Cardboard (featuring Klaus Teuber) is about this game's impact on American gaming communities and what came of it.

Awards
 1995: Spiel des Jahres Game of the Year
 1995: Deutscher Spiele Preis 1st place
 1995: Essen Feather
 1995: Meeples' Choice Award
 1996: Origins Award for Best Fantasy or Science Fiction Board Game
 2001: Origins Hall of Fame
 2004: Hra roku
 2005: Gra Roku Game of the Year
 2006: Games Magazine Hall of Fame
 2015: GamesCom Vegas Game of the Century

Video games
Since the game's release, a number of computer games have been published based on Settlers of Catan and its spinoffs. The first sanctioned English-language release was Catan: The Computer Game, developed for the PC by Castle Hill Studios and published by Big Fish Games.  This off-line game was available from MSN, as it was acquired by Microsoft who also released Catan Online in August 2005 on MSN Games, the game now requiring an internet connection. In 2005, Capcom edited the first portable version of Settlers of Catan on the N-Gage Nokia handheld device.

In June 2009 the MSN version of Settlers was discontinued. The same game later became available on other online services. Teuber and Big Huge Games worked together to produce Catan, a version of Settlers for the Xbox Live Arcade. It was released on 2 May 2007. Game Republic developed a PlayStation 3 version in 2008 titled also Catan.

A Nintendo DS version of Settlers was developed by Exozet Games GmbH in collaboration with Klaus Teuber. The game can be played against computer opponents, and includes Nintendo WiFi online play. It was released in 2009, but only in Europe.

The Settlers of Catan online game was announced on 16 December 2002. Catan Online World allows players to download a Java application that serves as a portal for the online world and allows online play with other members. The base game may be played for free, while expansions require a subscription membership.

Two official PC versions of Catan have been released, The First Island (the basic game only) and Cities & Knights (with Seafarers and Cities & Knights expansions). The First Island is available for the PC only in German. Cities & Knights was available in both English and German.

Catan and some of its expansions are also available in various languages for mobile phones, iPhone, iPad, iPod Touch, BlackBerry and Android smartphones.

Catan was released on Xbox Live Arcade in 2007. It was pulled without notice in mid-2014. There is no official word on why it was pulled or if it will return. Another game called Catan was released for the PlayStation Network in 2008. It also has been discontinued.

Mayfair Games announced in 2010 that a version of Catan was coming to Facebook.

In 2010, Vectorform showcased a Microsoft PixelSense game for Settlers of Catan. USM also developed an Android and iOS mobile app version simply called "Catan" with the various expansions available as DLC.

In August 2013, Catan: Creators Edition was made available for PC on Steam and Mac OS X in the Mac App Store. Catan: Creators Edition officially replaces the previous Catan: Cities & Knights. The game features both Seafarers plus the Cities & Knights expansions and includes a level editor.

In the summer of 2014, Bontom Games collaborated with Catan GmbH and Internet Explorer to develop an asynchronous version of Catan. Catan Anytime is a short-session, turn-based game designed for mainstream gamers. On 10 June 2016, Catan Anytime announced on their Facebook page that Catan Anytime had shut down operations. The web site catananytime.com is no longer available.

In April 2017, Catan Universe launched. Catan GmbH collaborated with Exozet and United Soft Media to make a cross platform version of Catan. Catan Universe is available in web, Steam, Amazon, iOS and Android platforms. While the Steam version has an average score, the mobile versions have a higher score of 4/5 stars. The game gained popularity during the COVID-19 pandemic in 2019/20 with a large number of new players, which overwhelmed servers at times.

In December 2017, the unlicensed and unendorsed website Colonist.io was launched.

On June 20, 2019 a version of Catan was released for Nintendo Switch, being developed by United Soft Media and Exozet, and being published by Asmodee Digital.

In November 2019, Niantic, Inc. announced that it was developing a new augmented reality mobile game, Catan: World Explorers.  The game is to be based on the Catan board games; players will move through the real world, using their smartphones to build a Catan universe.  However, during September 2021 Niantic announced the augmented reality game would be shut down after a year of early access without actually releasing it.

In November 2021, Dovetail Games and Asmodee Entertainment announced their intentions to bring a "digital tabletop" version of Catan to PlayStation 4, PlayStation 5, Xbox One and Xbox Series X/S. This project is a collaboration between Dovetail Games, Asmodee, Catan GmbH and Nomad Games. Dovetail Games are known for their simulation products, notably Train Simulator, Train Sim World and Bassmaster Fishing 2022.

Film/television adaptation
A short film titled The Lord of Catan was released in 2014. Actors Amy Acker and Fran Kranz starred in the film as a married couple enmeshed in an increasingly intense game of Catan.

In February 2015, Variety announced that producer Gail Katz had purchased the film and TV rights to The Settlers of Catan. Katz said, "The island of Catan is a vivid, visual, exciting and timeless world with classic themes and moral challenges that resonate today. There is a tremendous opportunity to take what people love about the game and its mythology as a starting point for the narrative". In October 2017, Variety reported that Sony Pictures was negotiating to acquire the rights to adapt it into a film, with Gail Katz still attached to the project.

Tournaments

U.S. National Championship 
Every year, thousands of Americans compete at local qualifying Catan tournaments in the United States. The winners of those tournaments are then guaranteed a seat at the Catan United States National Championship, which is held every year at the Origins Game Fair in Columbus, Ohio.

World Championship 
The first Catan World Championship was held in 2002 at the game fair "Internationalen Spieltage” in Essen, Germany. It took place there every year until 2008, when it was hosted at Gen Con Indy, in the United States. Since then, the Catan World Championship has taken place every two years, with the location alternating between the United States and Germany.

In 2018, there were participants in the World Championship from over forty countries. A maximum of two players per country are allowed to participate.

To be eligible to compete in the World Championship, all players must be over the age of 18, as well as a citizen or permanent resident of the country in which they are competing.

The World Championship is structured in three rounds: the preliminary round, the semifinals, and the finals. The preliminary round consists of three games, of which the top sixteen players advance to the semifinals. The semifinals are seeded based first on wins, then points, and then the quality of victory (percentage of total points earned per game) in the preliminary round games. The winner of each semifinal game then advances to the finals. The winner of the finals becomes the Catan World Champion.

As of March 2020, all Catan local qualifying tournaments have been postponed until 1 June 2020 due to the COVID-19 pandemic. Many national championships (including the U.S., Canada, and the UK) have also been postponed or canceled. On 12 May 2020 Catan Studio announced that they planned to postpone the Catan World Championship one full year, to November 2021. On 26 January 2021, another update further postponed it until November 2022. The event is still planned to take place in Valletta, Malta.

Here is a list of past winners and finalists of the Catan World Championship.

Online tournaments 
There are various short-form, long-form, and ongoing online Catan tournaments, including the Digital CATAN World Championship (DCWC), which debuted in autumn 2021, with a qualification round from August to October and a finals round held on 13 November.

See also
 List of world championships in mind sports
 Going Cardboard (Documentary, includes an interview with Klaus Teuber)

References

External links

 
  (Documentary, includes an interview with Klaus Teuber, Benjamin Teuber, and Guido Teuber.)
 
 Catan Studio, publishers of English Language CATAN.
 CatanShop.com and CatanShop.de, officially licensed online retailers for games and CATAN merchandise.

 
Embracer Group franchises
Board games introduced in 1995
Board games with a modular board
Deutscher Spiele Preis winners
Multiplayer games
Origins Award winners
Spiel des Jahres winners
Territorial acquisition and development games